Norton High School may refer to:

High schools
 Norton High School (Massachusetts), a public high school in Norton, Massachusetts
 Norton High School (Ohio), a public high school in Norton, Ohio
 Norton Community High School, a public high school in Norton, Kansas